Rescue swimming is the body of skills that enable an individual to attempt a rescue when a swimmer is in difficulty. These include a combination of communication skills, specific "rescue" swimming strokes, and release and evade techniques for self-preservation should the rescue go wrong. 

 From the outset once a swimmer in difficulty is spotted, eye contact must be maintained at all times.
 Assess the situation: environment, available physical equipment, others who can help, etc.
 Attempt to establish voice contact, which if successful can often result in a "voice-rescue".
 A rescuer should enter the water only as a last resort.
 Rescues should be attempted in the following order:  talk, throw, reach, wade, row, swim, tow and carry. 

There are four main rescue strokes: front crawl, breaststroke, inverted breaststroke, and sidestroke.

See also 
Swiftwater rescue

References

External links
 Free Lifesaving Society
 Lifesaving Society of Canada

Surf lifesaving
Rescue